Events from the year 1983 in North Korea.

Incumbents
Premier: Li Jong-ok 
Supreme Leader: Kim Il-sung

Events
Local elections

Births
 8 January - Kim Jong-un, Supreme Leader of North Korea since 2011 and the leader of the Workers' Party of Korea (WPK) since 2012, son of the Eternal General Secretary Kim Jong-il and grandson of the Eternal President Kim Il-sung.
 6 May - Kim Mi-yong.
 15 July - Kim Myong-won.
 19 July - Kim Yong-jun.

References

 
North Korea
1980s in North Korea
Years of the 20th century in North Korea
North Korea